Dubrassay is a town on the island of Saint Lucia; it is located at the northern end of the island towards its heart, near Four Roads Junction, Ti Rocher, and Trois Pitons.

Towns in Saint Lucia